Joppa railway station served the suburb of Joppa, Edinburgh, Scotland from 1859 to 1964 on the East Coast Main Line.

History 
The station opened on 16 May 1859 by the North British Railway. The station was closed to both passengers and goods traffic on 7 September 1964. The station building remains, however the platforms have been removed.

References

External links 

Disused railway stations in Edinburgh
Former North British Railway stations
Railway stations in Great Britain opened in 1859
Railway stations in Great Britain closed in 1964
1859 establishments in Scotland
1964 disestablishments in Scotland
Beeching closures in Scotland